"Kiss" is a song written and recorded by American nu metal band Korn, and produced by The Matrix and Atticus Ross for Korn's untitled eighth studio album. It was released as the album's third and final single on April 7, 2008.

Music and structure 
"Kiss" features Terry Bozzio on drums, who had provided for eight of the album's songs. Jonathan Davis also provided additional percussion for the song, along with "Hushabye". The song makes use of keyboards by Zac Baird, heavy drum patterns and violins. AllMusic described "Kiss" as "like [a] vaguely Beatlesque Mellotron," implying its difference from the rest of the album.

Charts

References 

Songs about kissing
2007 singles
Korn songs
Song recordings produced by the Matrix (production team)
2000s ballads
Song recordings produced by Atticus Ross
2007 songs
EMI Records singles
Songs written by Reginald Arvizu
Songs written by Jonathan Davis
Songs written by James Shaffer
Rock ballads
Songs written by Leopold Ross